Fuldatal is a municipality in the district of Kassel, in Hesse, Germany. It is situated along the Fulda River, 5 km northeast of Kassel.

Kassel-Rothwesten Airfield, a former military airbase and barracks, is located in Fuldatal.

References

Kassel (district)